Tasmantrix is a genus of small primitive metallic moths in the family Micropterigidae.

Species
Tasmantrix calliplaca (Meyrick, 1922)
Tasmantrix fragilis Gibbs, 2010
Tasmantrix lunaris Gibbs, 2010
Tasmantrix nigrocornis Gibbs, 2010
Tasmantrix phalaros Gibbs, 2010
Tasmantrix tasmaniensis Gibbs, 2010
Tasmantrix thula Gibbs, 2010

References

Micropterigidae
Moth genera